The 1936 Norwegian Football Cup was the 35th season of the Norwegian annual knockout football tournament. The tournament was open for all members of NFF, except those from Northern Norway. The final was played at Ullevaal Stadion in Oslo on 25 October 1936, and was contested by the defending champions Fredrikstad and the two-time former winners Mjøndalen. Fredrikstad successfully defended their title with a 2–0 victory, securing their third Norwegian Cup trophy.

Rounds and dates
 First round: 23 August
 Second round: 30 August
 Third round: 13 September
 Fourth round: 27 September
 Quarter-finals: 4 October
 Semi-finals: 11 October
 Final: 25 October

First round

|-
|colspan="3" style="background-color:#97DEFF"|Replay

|}

Second round

|}

Third round

|-
|colspan="3" style="background-color:#97DEFF"|Replay

|}

Fourth round

|}

Quarter-finals

|}

Semi-finals

|}

Final

See also
1936 in Norwegian football

References

Norwegian Football Cup seasons
Norway
Cup